PB-1 Sherani-cum-Zhob is a constituency of the Provincial Assembly of Balochistan. This constituency is represented by Pakistan Tehreek-e-Insaf leader Sardar Babar Khan Musakhel who is current Deputy Speaker of the Balochistan Assembly

General elections 2018
General elections were held on 25 July 2018.

See also

 PB-51 Chaman-II
 PB-2 Zhob

References

External links
 Election commission Pakistan's official website
 Awazoday.com check result
 Balochistan's Assembly official site

Constituencies of Balochistan